Enrique Rabell (born 31 January 1941 in Querétaro, Querétaro) is a Mexican former swimmer who competed in the 1960 Summer Olympics.

References

1941 births
Living people
Mexican male swimmers
Male backstroke swimmers
Sportspeople from Querétaro
Sportspeople from Querétaro City
Olympic swimmers of Mexico
Swimmers at the 1959 Pan American Games
Swimmers at the 1960 Summer Olympics
Swimmers at the 1963 Pan American Games
Pan American Games competitors for Mexico
Central American and Caribbean Games gold medalists for Mexico
Competitors at the 1962 Central American and Caribbean Games
Central American and Caribbean Games medalists in swimming
20th-century Mexican people
21st-century Mexican people